Before God and Man (German: Vor Gott und den Menschen) is a 1955 West German drama film directed by Erich Engel and starring Viktor de Kowa, Antje Weisgerber and Hans Söhnker.  It was shot at the Tempelhof Studios in West Berlin. The film's sets were designed by the art directors Emil Hasler and Walter Kutz.

Synopsis
Shortly after the Second World War, Maria marries fellow lawyer Martin who had been severely wounded in action. She believes that her first husband Georg was killed in action, and married Martin to some degree out of pity. Several years later Georg resurfaces alive in Leipzig in East Germany and tries to resume their former relationship, but Maria comes to realise that it is Martin that she truly loves.

Cast
 Viktor de Kowa as 	Martin
 Antje Weisgerber as 	Maria 
 Hans Söhnker as 	Georg
 Käthe Braun as 	Katharina
 Emmy Burg as 	Anna Mechala
 Werner Peters as 	Anton Mechala
 Hilde Sessak as  Ida Jucharz
 Trude Berliner as  Frau Vikarin
 Gerhard Bienert as  Wachtmeister
 Maly Delschaft as Dienstmädchen Lina
 Erich Dunskus as Richter
 Hans Hessling as  Vogel, Trompeter
 Karl Klüsner as  Geistlicher
 Franz-Otto Krüger as  Verkehrspolizist
 Klaus Miedel as  Staatsanwalt
 Hans Stiebner as  Mann beim Barbier
 Elsa Wagner as Schwester Else

References

Bibliography
 Bock, Hans-Michael & Bergfelder, Tim. The Concise CineGraph. Encyclopedia of German Cinema. Berghahn Books, 2009.
 Elsaesser, Thomas & Wedel, Michael . The BFI companion to German cinema. British Film Institute, 1999.

External links 
 

1955 films
1955 drama films
German drama films
West German films
1950s German-language films
Films directed by Erich Engel
1950s German films
Films shot at Tempelhof Studios

de:Vor Gott und den Menschen